Ha-109 was an Imperial Japanese Navy Ha-101-class submarine. Completed as a transport submarine, she was converted into a submarine tender for midget submarines. She served during the final months of World War II, surrendered at the end of the war in September 1945, and was scuttled in April 1946.

Design and description

The Ha-101-class submarines were designed as small, cheap transport submarines to resupply isolated island garrisons. They displaced  surfaced and  submerged. They were designed to carry  of cargo.

For surface running, the boats were powered by a single  diesel engine that drove one propeller shaft. When submerged the propeller was driven by a  electric motor. They could reach  on the surface and  underwater. The boats were armed a single mount for a  Type 96 anti-aircraft gun.

Construction and commissioning

Ha-109 was laid down on 1 August 1944 by Mitsbishi at Kobe, Japan, as Small Supply Submarine No. 4609. Renamed Ha-109, she was launched on 10 January 1945. She was completed and commissioned on 10 March 1945.

Service history

Upon commissioning, Ha-109 was attached to the Kure Naval District and assigned to Submarine Squadron 11 for workups. On 20 March 1945, however, she was reassigned to the 10th Special Attack Unit and began conversion to a submarine tender for midget submarines, the conversion involving modifying her cargo hold to accommodate ten  torpedoes for midget submarines.

Ha-109 was in Saeki Bay at Matsuura, Japan, when hostilities between Japan and the Allies ended on 15 August 1945. Upon receiving the news that day, her crew destroyed her secret documents and distributed some of the food and fuel on board to local fishermen. In late August 1945, she proceeded from Saeki Bay to Kure, Japan, her crew throwing all of her ammunition and the torpedoes in her hold overboard during the voyage. Only a skeleton crew consisting of her commanding officer and seven crewmen remained aboard after her arrival at Kure on 24 August 1945. She surrendered to the Allies at Kure on 2 September 1945.

In November 1945, the U.S. Navy ordered all Japanese submarines at Kure, including Ha-109, to move to Sasebo, Japan.

Disposal
The Japanese struck Ha-109 from the Navy list on 30 November 1945.

Notes

References
 

 
 , History of Pacific War Extra, "Perfect guide, The submarines of the Imperial Japanese Forces", Gakken (Japan), March 2005, 
 Ships of the World special issue Vol.37, History of Japanese Submarines, (Japan), August 1993
 The Maru Special, Japanese Naval Vessels No.43 Japanese Submarines III, Ushio Shobō (Japan), September 1980, Book code 68343-43
 The Maru Special, Japanese Naval Vessels No.132 Japanese Submarines I "Revised edition", Ushio Shobō (Japan), February 1988, Book code 68344-36
 Senshi Sōsho Vol.88, Naval armaments and war preparation (2), "And after the outbreak of war", Asagumo Simbun (Japan), October 1975

Ha-101-class submarines
Ships built by Mitsubishi Heavy Industries
1945 ships
World War II submarines of Japan
Maritime incidents in 1946
Scuttled vessels
Shipwrecks in the Pacific Ocean
Shipwrecks of Japan